Queest-alb Glacier is in Snoqualmie National Forest in the U.S. state of Washington, on the west slopes of Three Fingers. Queest-alb Glacier is also known as Three Fingers Glacier, but neither name is officially recognized by the United States Geological Survey.

See also
List of glaciers in the United States

References

Cirques of the United States
Glaciers of Snohomish County, Washington